Sonia Satra (born December 17, 1967, in Glen Ridge, New Jersey)  is an American actress. She is known for her roles on Guiding Light and One Life to Live.

Personal life
She was born, the youngest of three children, to Gunvor Satra, a Norwegian history professor, and John Satra, an Austrian economics professor. Before starting a career in acting, she attended Rutgers University, where she earned a Bachelor of Arts degree in communication.

Satra is married to Stephen David, whom is the president and executive producer of Stephen David Entertainment,  and they have two children, Kaya (born in c. 2004) and Ty (born in 2007).

Career
She is best known for her work as Lucy Cooper on the soap opera Guiding Light, which she played from 1993 to 1997, and for her role as Barbara Graham on One Life to Live from 1998 to 1999. She has since dabbled in movie production, producing and starring in the film Pride & Loyalty in 2002. She was also in The Men Who Built America and American Genius.

Filmography

References

External links

Sonia Satra biography

1967 births
American film actresses
Film producers from New Jersey
American soap opera actresses
American people of Austrian descent
Living people
American people of Norwegian descent
People from Glen Ridge, New Jersey
American women film producers
21st-century American women